Upsilon Piscis Austrini (υ Piscis Austrini) is a solitary, orange-hued star in the southern constellation of Piscis Austrinus. It is faintly visible to the naked eye with an apparent visual magnitude of +4.98. Based upon an annual parallax shift of 7.69 mas as seen from the Earth, the star is located 420 light-years from the Sun.

This is an evolved K-type giant star with a stellar classification of K4 III. It is catalogued as a member of the Wolf 630 moving group. Upsilon Piscis Austrini is moving through the galaxy at a speed of 36.4 km/s relative to the Sun. Its projected galactic orbit carries it between 17,700 and 25,400 light-years from the center of the galaxy.

References

K-type giants
Piscis Austrini, Upsilon
Piscis Austrinus
Durchmusterung objects
210066
109289
8433